Gabriel Muller (born 12 April 1985) is a French cyclist, who currently rides for UCI ProTeam .

Muller studied at the University of Paris-Est Marne-la-Vallée and later at ESC Lille. He only began cycling in 2016 at the age of 30, and in 2019 signed a contract with UCI Continental team , gaining their attention via a former member of the team. Notably finishing 12th in the Tour de Serbie, he signed a contract for the 2021 season with UCI ProTeam  at the age of 35. In August 2021, he competed in his first UCI World Tour race: the Bretagne Classic Ouest–France.

References

External links

1985 births
Living people
French male cyclists
People from Bondy
Sportspeople from Seine-Saint-Denis
Cyclists from Île-de-France